Hope is the third studio album by Canadian indie rock band The Strumbellas. The album was released on April 22, 2016 by Glassnote Records and Underneath A Mountain Records.

Background 
The album is the third studio album to be released by The Strumbellas. It was released on March 29, 2019 by Glassnote Records and Underneath A Mountain Records.

Track listing

Personnel 
Credits adapted from AllMusic.

 Alex Arias – editing
 Krystle Blue – vocals
 John Dinsmore – engineer, slide guitar
 Jeremy Drury – drums, group member, percussion, vocals
 Annisa Hart – cello
 Jon Hembrey – group member, guitar, vocals
 Joel Hustak – artwork, layout
 Darryl James – bass, group member, vocals
 Brian Pickett - composer 
 Isabel Ritchie – group member, viola, violin, vocals
 Dave Ritter – group member, keyboards, percussion, vocals
 Dave Shiffman – producer, engineer
 Jason Sniderman – piano
 William Sperandei – trumpet
 Gentry Studer – assistant mastering engineer
 Richard Underhill – sexophone
 Simon Ward – group member, guitar, vocals
 Howie Weinberg – mastering

References 

2016 albums
Indie rock albums by Canadian artists